Knowledge Systems Laboratory (KSL) was an artificial intelligence research laboratory within the Department of Computer Science at Stanford University until 2007, located in the Gates Computer Science Building, Stanford. Work focused on knowledge representation for shareable engineering knowledge bases and systems, computational environments for modelling physical devices, architectures for adaptive intelligent systems, and expert systems for science and engineering. 
KSL had projects with Stanford Medical Informatics (SMI), the Stanford Artificial Intelligence Lab (SAIL), the Stanford Formal Reasoning Group (SFRG), the Stanford Logic Group, and the Stanford Center for Design Research (CDR).

Past members

This is a partial list (in alphabetical order) of past members:

 Edward Feigenbaum
 Richard Fikes
 Diana E. Forsythe
 Tom Gruber
 William Clancey
 Alon Y. Halevy
 Deborah L. McGuinness
 Paulo Pinheiro
 Derek H. Sleeman
 Barbara Hayes-Roth
 Bruce G. Buchanan
 Ruth Duran Huard
 Lee Brownston

References

 Archived Publications: "The Edward A. Feigenbaum Papers: Work in Artificial Intelligence and Computer Science at Stanford University". Stanford University Libraries. Retrieved 22 July 2018.

Stanford University